Svend Skrydstrup (21 January 1940 – 1 July 2010) was a Danish wrestler. He competed in the men's Greco-Roman featherweight at the 1964 Summer Olympics.

References

External links
 

1940 births
2010 deaths
Danish male sport wrestlers
Olympic wrestlers of Denmark
Wrestlers at the 1964 Summer Olympics
People from Sønderborg Municipality
Sportspeople from the Region of Southern Denmark